Alexandru Sibirski was a Moldovan politician.

Biography 

Alexandru Sibirski served as mayor of Chişinău (1937–1938).

External links 
 Primari ai oraşului Chişinău

Notes

Mayors of Chișinău
Year of birth missing
Year of death missing